Denis Valeryevich Denisov (born December 31, 1981) is a Russian former professional ice hockey defenceman who played in the Kontinental Hockey League (KHL). He was selected by Buffalo Sabres in the 5th round (149th overall) of the 2000 NHL Entry Draft.

Early life
Denisov was born into a military family, stationed in Kharkiv at the time of his birth. The family later moved to Tver, and he began playing hockey at the age of 9.

Playing career
He formerly played as Captain for HC CSKA Moscow from 2012–13 to the 2016–17 season. On May 1, 2017, Denisov opted to continue his KHL career with finalists, Metallurg Magnitogorsk, agreeing to a two-year contract.

International play

Denisov was named to the Russia men's national ice hockey team for competition at the 2014 IIHF World Championship. Denisov played a good tournament producing in 10 games 0 goals and 1 assist.

Career statistics

Regular season and playoffs

International

References

External links

1981 births
Ak Bars Kazan players
Avangard Omsk players
Buffalo Sabres draft picks
HC CSKA Moscow players
HC Dynamo Moscow players
Krylya Sovetov Moscow players
Living people
Metallurg Magnitogorsk players
Russian ice hockey defencemen
Salavat Yulaev Ufa players
SKA Saint Petersburg players
Sportspeople from Kharkiv